Farid Alamdar oglu Nabiyev (born on 22 July 1999) is an Azerbaijani professional footballer who plays as a  midfielder for Azerbaijan Premier League club Kapaz PFK.

Club career
On 7 March 2020, Nabiyev made his debut for Viktoria Žižkov in a 5–2 home victory against Dukla Prague.

References

External links
 
 

1999 births
Living people
Association football midfielders
Azerbaijani footballers
Azerbaijan under-21 international footballers
Azerbaijan youth international footballers
Azerbaijani expatriate footballers
Expatriate footballers in the Czech Republic
Azerbaijan Premier League players
Czech National Football League players
Gabala FC players
SK Slavia Prague players
FK Viktoria Žižkov players
Erovnuli Liga 2 players
Expatriate footballers in Georgia (country)
Azerbaijani expatriate sportspeople in Georgia (country)
Azerbaijani expatriate sportspeople in the Czech Republic